Micro-Vett has been an Italian company manufacturing electric vehicles.

History

Beginning 
Micro-Vett was founded in 1986 in Voltana di Lugo (RA) by three shareholders including Mr. Galli and Mr. Giacomoni. A new four-wheel electric vehicle, similar to current quadricycles, the Lady, is developed and built from scratch.
Starting from 1989 Coop. Car, a cooperative from Imola gradually acquired Micro-Vett shares becoming majority shareholder and transferring the headquarters in Imola. At that time, the management understood the difficulties related to the manufacturing of vehicle body and decided to focus solely on electrification components. Consequently, Micro-Vett started a partnership with Bedford for the electrification of Rascal, a small van for people and goods delivery, which is manufactured in several tens of units.
In 1991 after bankruptcy of the parent company Coop. Car, even Micro-Vett was declared bankrupted and, after a brief period of inactivity, it was taken over by Mr. Gaetano Di Gioia, already manager of his buy out by Coop. Car.

The Electric Porter 

The company from Imola continues the production of Rascal, but, given the lack of involvement of the vehicle manufacturer, approached Piaggio with which, starting from 1994, launches a collaboration for the electrification of Porter.
This vehicle, thanks to purchasing incentives, meets a great success in the Italian market and it was manufactured from 1994 to 2003 in about 5,000 units. The lead-acid batteries provide a range of 60 km and a top speed of 65 km/h. Piaggio delivers the vehicles without endothermic engine to Micro-Vett and here they're converted into electric. The sale of the complete vehicle is done in almost all cases directly by Piaggio.
During this period the company took part in many sport events for electric vehicles, including the 24 hours of Turin and the Monte-Carlo Rally for alternative energies propelled vehicles, by winning prestigious results.

Zebra batteries and the new vehicles 
Starting from the end of the 1990s, once the technology of Zebra batteries, which can provide an energy density about four times than lead-acid batteries, has become available, Micro-Vett manufactured many prototypes including Eurocargo in association with Iveco and different units of Porter with long range.
Since 2001 Micro-Vett fleet is expanded with the introduction of electric Daily and Ydea, a quadricycle made by Casalini. However, the high cost of Zebra batteries severely limits the market penetration that is still dominated, in terms of Micro-Vett sales, by Piaggio Porter.
Another vehicle that takes up a prominent place in Micro-Vett range is the Daily in bimodal version, manufactured since 2004. By placing an electric motor on the shaft, the vehicle can be driven both by diesel engine both by electric motor, ensuring a unique flexibility of use. Battery recharge occurs both from electrical grid both when the vehicle is driven by the diesel engine. This project is shown to Iveco which, however, is not interested in. So Micro-Vett directly markets this vehicle with a sales volume from 2004 to 2011 of approximately 600 units.

Lithium batteries and FIAT range 
The appearance of the first lithium batteries for automotive use manufactured in China at low cost since 2005, pushed Micro-Vett to test this technology making perhaps the first European prototypes of motor vehicle equipped with this technology.
The company began the manufacturing of Fiat Doblò in an electric version. This vehicle, too, was sold directly by Micro-Vett to final customers, because the transformation was not explicitly supported by FIAT. The new batteries guarantee a range up to 150 km, but have some security issues, pushing Micro-Vett to test different suppliers, to finally focus on two manufacturers from South Korea.
In 2009 Micro-Vett started the production of electric Fiorino and Qubo that meet a good market success is Italy and Europe; in fact, since 2007 the company creates a network of European and extra-European dealers. The main markets are France, (Germany), Norway, the Netherlands and Spain, but many vehicles are also sold in Russia, Hong Kong, Finland and Baltic countries.

In 2009 too the company from Imola developed the e500, electric version of the new Fiat 500, which is presented at London Motorshow by the English dealer Nice Car.
Then Micro-Vett developed the electric Ducato, in all its models. The configuration of the batteries can be dimensioned according to customer requirements. For this vehicle Micro-Vett started a partnership with the French company Gruau, which installs the kits provided by Micro-Vett on the vehicles.
Interrupted since 2006 the collaboration with Piaggio, which now offers a version of electric Porter independently made, Micro-Vett triggers a similar base vehicle search. A first partnership with the Uz-Daewoo, Uzbek manufacturing site of Daewoo, was unsuccessful and other partnership with Chinese OEMs or Italian importers of Chinese vehicles too; finally Micro-Vett begun a relationship with VEM, which lead to the birth of the EdyOne in 2011.

Prototypes and projects 
Throughout its history, Micro-Vett implemented many electric-powered prototypes, including the bus Albatros in collaboration with the local public transport company of Rimini, a Ducato with endothermic engine on the front axle and electric motor on the rear axle in partnership with Al-Ko, a three-wheels motorcycle, a bimodal hearse, an all-electric excavator in collaboration with Venieri, a bimodal boat for carrying 70 people, etc..
Micro-Vett also developed CHAdeMO protocols for rapid charging of its vehicles at 50 kW; moreover the company also attended many national and European projects, including Green eMotion under the 7th European framework program.

Customers 
At the beginning of 2011, when the company had a turnover of around 17 million Euros and employed 50 people, the vehicle range included EdyOne, e500, Fiorino, Doblò, Ducato and Bimodal Daily.
Main customers are state-owned companies and delivery companies, including Trambus, Reggio Emilia Municipality, Italian Mail, Turin Municipality, Milan Municipality, San Martino Hospital in Genoa, Cinque Terre National Park, VeLoCe from Vicenza, Bartolini, DHL, Acciona Madrid, Eurodisney Paris, La Poste France, Cannes Municipality, Monaco Municipality, Moscow Municipality, RWE, ESB Ireland, etc..

Crisis 
Since the second half of 2011, both for the electric vehicle market contraction caused by the international crisis, both for the debts due to non-payment by Italian state-owned companies, both for technical problems mainly related to some defective components, Micro-Vett became on crisis and in February 2013 the court of Bologna declared its bankruptcy.

Relaunch 
After some bankruptcy auctions with no offers, the company was taken over during April 2014 by the Bocchi family that moved it to Altavilla Vicentina. The new company is led by Claudio Cicero, already hired in the previous Micro-Vett and winner of the 2010 World Championship FIA Alternative Energies Cup with a Micro-Vett e500.
Despite the limited manpower with regards to Imola phase, the company manufactures purely electric prototypes on Fiat chassis: Panda, Fiorino and Doblò. The technical peculiarity of these vehicles is the application of an innovative idea – which will then be patented – aimed to maintain all the auxiliary services activated by the belt of the combustion engine. This means lower costs and greater reliability.
Fiat shows a lot of interest in these vehicles and therefore Micro-Vett approaches some Piedmontese companies concerned with the industrialization of the prototypes.

The End 
However, no agreement is reached and activities are gradually slowed down and finally stopped. At the end of 2016, the whole workforce leaves Micro-Vett. Since mid 2019 the website is no longer active.

References 

Electric vehicle manufacturers of Italy